Graphium aristeus, the chain swordtail, is a butterfly in the family Papilionidae (swallowtails). It is found in the Indomalayan and Australasian realms. The Indian subspecies G. a. anticrates is protected by law in India. It is found in Sikkim, Bhutan, Meghalaya, West Bengal and Assam.

Description

The first description was given by Caspar Stoll in 1782.

The forewings are yellowish. The outer part of the wing is dark brown and contains a thin yellow strip. Four dark brown stripes dominate the wing. Next to the body there is a dark brown area. The underside of Graphium aristeus is very similar to the upperside.

The hindwings are yellowish and they have long tails. The edge is wavy. The outer part of the wing is dark brown and contains a chain of yellow spots. The inner edge is dark brown. In the middle of the wing there is a dark brown strip. The underside is very similar to the upperside, but a chain of red spots dominates the wing.

The body is black. The thorax and the head are also black. The underside of all parts is yellow.

Distribution 

Graphium aristeus is a butterfly from the Australasian and Indomalayan realms. It is also widely distributed in New Guinea.

Papua localities: Salawati: Salawati Mountains; Biak: Wardo; New Guinea: Akimuga (Kampong Baru & Fafafuku), Beaufortbivak, Dabra (Mamberamo), East Tami, Homasam, Kobakama, Kopi River (Timika), Kuala Kenkana (Timika), Van Weels Camp (Keerom), Wendesi, Werba (Fakfak)

External distribution: Northern India, Sikkim to South China, Philippines and Indonesia, New Guinea, Queensland, New Britain, New Ireland and Manus.

Subspecies
Graphium aristeus aristeus Ambon, Serang
Graphium aristeus anticrates (Doubleday, 1846) North India, Nepal, Sikkim, Assam
Graphium aristeus hermocrates (C. & R. Felder, 1865) Burma - Thailand, Timor, Wetar, Damar, Philippines (Balabac, Basilan, Bohol, Bongao, Busuanga, Cebu, Dinagar, Dumaran, Leyte, Luzon, Marnduque, Masbate, Mindanao, Mindoro, Negros, Palawan, Panaon, Panay, Samar, Sibuyan, Siquijor, Tawitawi)
Graphium aristeus hainanensis (Chou & Gu, 1994) Hainan
Graphium aristeus parmatus (Gray, [1853]) Aru, Waigeu, W.Irian, New Guinea, Papua, North Queensland
Graphium aristeus paron (Godman & Salvin, 1879) New Britain, New Ireland
Graphium aristeus bifax (Rothschild, 1898) Obi

See also
Papilionidae
List of butterflies of India
List of butterflies of India (Papilionidae)

References

External links

Arista
Pathysa
Butterflies of Asia
Butterflies of Indochina
Butterflies of Indonesia
Lepidoptera of New Guinea
Taxa named by Caspar Stoll
Butterflies described in 1782